Pseudopostega strigulata is a species of moth of the family Opostegidae. It was first described by Puplesis and Robinson in 1999. It is exclusively native to Assam, in India.

References

Opostegidae
Moths described in 1999